This is a timeline documenting events of Jazz in the year 1918.

Births in that year included Wild Bill Davis and Cachao López.

Standards

 In 1918 the standard "After You've Gone" was released.

Births

 January
 1 – Nat Jaffe, American pianist (died 1945).
 5 – Dal Richards, American big-band leader (died 2015).
 9 – Betty Roché, American singer (died 1999).
 10 – Aaron Bridgers, African-American pianist (died 2003).
 17 – Irene Daye, American singer (died 1974).
 27 – Elmore James, American guitarist (died 1963).

 February
 5 – Eraldo Volonté, Italian saxophonist and bandleader (died 2003).
 18 – Mariano Mores, Argentine tango composer and pianist (died 2016).
 20 – Phil Moore, American pianist (died 1987).
 23 – Money Johnson, American trumpeter (died 1978).
 25 – George Desmond Hodnett, Irish musician, songwriter, and critic (died 1990).

 March
 6 – Howard McGhee, American trumpeter (died 1987).
 14 – Verne Byers, American band leader and bassist (died 2008).
 18 – Sam Donahue, American tenor saxophonist and trumpeter (died 1974).
 20 – Marian McPartland, British-born pianist, composer and arranger (died 2013).
 21 – Charles Thompson, American pianist, organist and arranger (died 2016).
 26 – Andy Hamilton, Jamaican-born British saxophonist (died 2012).
 29 – Pearl Bailey, American actress and singer (died 1990).

 April
 7 – Peanuts Hucko, American clarinetist (died 2003).
 18 – Tony Mottola, American guitarist (died 2004).

 May
 14 – Sammy Lowe, American trumpeter and arranger (died 1993).

 June
 11 – Irene Higginbotham, African-American songwriter and concert pianist (died 1988).
 14 – John Simmons, American bassist (died 1979).

 July
 12 – Rusty Dedrick, American trumpeter (died 2009).
 31 – Hank Jones, American pianist and composer (died 2010).

 August
 3 – Eddie Jefferson, American vocalist and lyricist (died 1979).
 8 – Knocky Parker, American pianist (died 1986).
 10 – Arnett Cobb, American tenor saxophonist (died 1989).
 17 – Ike Quebec, American tenor saxophonist (died 1963).
 19 – Jimmy Rowles, American pianist, vocalist and composer (died 1996).
 23 – Kjeld Bonfils, Danish pianist and vibraphone player (died 1984).
 25 – Freddie Kohlman, American drummer vocalist, and bandleader (died 1990).

 September
 4 – Gerald Wilson, American trumpeter, big-band leader, and composer (died 2014).
 8 – Bill Graham, American saxophonist (died 1975).
 12 – Waldren Joseph, American trombonist (died 2004).
 14 – Cachao López, Cuban mambo musician, bassist and composer (died 2008).
 17 – Hubert Rostaing, American clarinetist and tenor saxophonist (died 1990).
 21 – Tommy Potter, American upright bassist (died 1988).

 October
 5 – Jimmy Blanton, American upright bassist (died 1942).
 9 – Bebo Valdés, Cuban pianist, bandleader, composer, and arranger (died 2013).
 10 – Bobby Byrne, American bandleader, trombonist, and music executive (died 2006).
 18 – Bobby Troup, American pianist and songwriter (died 1999).
 25 – Chubby Jackson, American upright bassist and bandleader (died 2003).

 November
 11 – Louise Tobin, American singer (died 2022).
 24 – Wild Bill Davis, American jazz pianist, organist, and arranger (died 1995).

 December
 2 – Milton DeLugg, American accordionist and composer (died 2015).
 12 – Joe Williams, American vocalist (died 1999).
 21 – Panama Francis, American drummer (died 2001).
 24 – Dave Bartholomew, American trumpeter, band leader, composer and arranger (died 2019).
 25 – Eddie Safranski, American upright bassist (died 1974).
 26 – Butch Ballard, American drummer (died 2011).
 30 – Jimmy Jones, American pianist (died 1982).

 Unknown date
 Joan C. Edwards, American singer (died 2006).

References

External links
 History Of Jazz Timeline: 1918 at All About Jazz

Jazz, 1918 In
Jazz by year